Jaber Al-Ameri (born 18 February 1986) is a Saudi Arabian professional footballer who currently plays as a goalkeeper for Najran SC.

Club career
He started at Al-Ittihad then joined the Najran squad where he got the chance to show his abilities. On 6 November 2013, it was reported that Weymouth F.C. had signed a contract with him.

References

External links

1986 births
Association football goalkeepers
Saudi Arabian footballers
Living people
Ittihad FC players
Najran SC players
Al-Faisaly FC players
Al-Shoulla FC players